Jim King (23 November 1873 – 9 January 1929) was an Australian rules footballer who played with South Melbourne and St Kilda in the Victorian Football League (VFL).

King was the brother of former St. Kilda Football Club player, Jack King and Stawell Gift winning trainer and 1908 Stawell Gift winner, Chris King.

King died in tragic circumstances when a tree fell on him after cleaning up after a bush fire on his land in Holbrook and crushed his skull.

Notes

External links 

1873 births
1929 deaths
Australian rules footballers from Victoria (Australia)
Sydney Swans players
St Kilda Football Club players
Rutherglen Football Club players
Accidental deaths in New South Wales